Clarence is a hamlet and census-designated place (CDP) within the town of Clarence in Erie County, New York, United States. The population was 2,646 at the 2010 census.

Clarence is part of the Buffalo–Niagara Falls Metropolitan Statistical Area.

Geography
The Clarence CDP is located at  (42.98054, -78.59177), in the southeastern part of the town of Clarence. New York State Route 5, Main Street, passes east–west through the center of the CDP.

The hamlet is also called "Clarence Hollow", or just "The Hollow", due its location centered at the base of an indentation in the Onondaga Escarpment formed by Ransom Creek. The Clarence Historical Society is located on Main Street. During the time of its founding, Clarence village was called "Pine Grove" and later "Ransomville".

Demographics

References

External links
Town of Clarence

Census-designated places in New York (state)
Buffalo–Niagara Falls metropolitan area
Census-designated places in Erie County, New York